In Scottish folklore, a Lavellan, làbh-allan, la-mhalan or la-bhallan is a creature from northern Scotland.

It was generally considered to be a kind of rodent, and the name "làbh-allan" is also used for a water shrew or water vole in Scottish Gaelic. It was however, reportedly larger than a rat, very noxious, and lived in deep pools in rivers. Its poisonous abilities were legendary, and it was said to be able to injure cattle over a hundred feet away.

Fleming, describing the Ermine, compared the prejudice against the animal to Sibbald's account of the country people's dislike of the Lavellan; Sibbald writing that the Lavellan was common in Caithness. Thomas Pennant made enquiries about the animal while in Ausdale in the county, and it is also mentioned in the work of Rob Donn, the Scottish Gaelic poet from Sutherland.

Pennant claims the locals preserved the skin, and, as a cure for their sick beasts, gave them the water in which it had been dipped.

See also
Dobhar-chu
Kelpie

References

Sources
  (làbh-allan)
 Lewis Spence - The Magic Arts in Celtic Britain
 Fleming, John  D.D. F.R.S.E. M.W.S. et al. (1828). History of British animals, exhibiting the descriptive characters and systematical arrangement of the genera and species of quadrupeds, birds, reptiles, fishes, mollusca, and radiata of the united kingdom; including the indigenous, extirpated, and extinct kinds, together with periodical and occasional visitants. Edinburgh: Bell & Bradfute.
 Mary Macleod Banks Reviewed work: The Peat Fire Flame by Alasdair Alpine MacGregor Folklore, Vol. 48, No. 4 (Dec., 1937), pp. 408–409. (paywall/JSTOR)

Legendary mammals
Monsters
Scottish folklore
Scottish legendary creatures

sco:Lavellan